Peter Stanley Mendham (born 9 April 1960) is an English former professional footballer who played as a midfielder for Norwich City. He was played in the side that won the Milk Cup in 1985. In February 2007, he was sentenced to seven and a half years in prison for wounding with intent his girlfriend. His sentence was later reduced to five years. In 2011, he returned to football as assistant manager at Newmarket Town F.C.

Career
Mendham came through the youth ranks at Carrow Road, and played 267 first-team games (211 in the league), and scored 29 goals for the Canaries. He was forced to retire because of injury in 1987. He was a member of the Norwich teams that won the Football League Cup in 1985, and the Second Division championship in 1986. Following his premature retirement, the club awarded Mendham a testimonial match against Real Sociedad, and he continued to work for the club for several years as 'Football in the Community Officer'.

After his retirement from the professional game, Mendham continued to play non-league football, and scored the winning goal for Diss Town in the final of the 1994 FA Vase at Wembley. He worked as a fundraiser for a charity in East Anglia after he stopped playing.

In the 1990s, Peter coached youths and children in the Norwich area.

In 2008–09 Mendham played for Sproughton Sports in the Suffolk and Ipswich League, Division 4.

Criminal proceedings
On 19 October 2006, Mendham was arrested, and later charged with the attempted murder of his 39-year-old girlfriend at their house in Norwich after a heated argument. The woman had suffered a stab wound, and lost a kidney during emergency surgery.

In December 2006, Mendham denied the attempted murder charge, but one month later, he pleaded guilty to a reduced charge of wounding with intent. On 21 February 2007, Mendham was sentenced to seven and a half years in prison. On 24 May 2007, Mendham announced that he would appeal against the sentence.

He won the appeal and the sentence was reduced to five years.

Honours

As a player
 League Cup winner 1985
 Second division championship winner 1986
 FA Vase winner 1994

References

External links
Ex-canaries.co.uk
Mendham is charged - report from Eastern Daily Press

Other sources

Living people
1960 births
Sportspeople from King's Lynn
English footballers
Association football midfielders
English Football League players
Norwich City F.C. players
Miramar Rangers AFC players
Hammarby Fotboll players
NAC Breda players
Diss Town F.C. players
Wroxham F.C. players
Watton United F.C. players
King's Lynn F.C. players
Norwich United F.C. players
English expatriate footballers
English expatriate sportspeople in New Zealand
Expatriate association footballers in New Zealand
English expatriate sportspeople in Sweden
Expatriate footballers in Sweden
English expatriate sportspeople in the Netherlands
Expatriate footballers in the Netherlands